The Women's BMX 24" wheel event at the 2010 South American Games was held on March 19. The qualifications started at 9:00 and the Final at 10:30.

Medalists

Results

Qualification

Heat 1

Heat 2

Final

References
Qualification
Final

Cycling at the 2010 South American Games
South